Helichrysum artvinense, the Artvinian everlasting, is a herbaceous plant, a member of the family Asteraceae.

Distribution 
It is a native species to Turkey.

Taxonomy 
It was named by Peter Hadland Davis and Frances Kristina Kupicha, in Not. Roy. Bot. Gard. Edinb. 33: 240, in 1974. This name is unresolved.

References 

artvinense